The Yell Masonic Lodge Hall is a historic Masonic lodge on the west side of United States Route 412 in Carrollton, Arkansas.  Also known as Carrollton Masonic Lodge, it is a two-story wood-frame structure measuring about 50 by 35 feet with a front-gable roof, clapboard siding, and a stone foundation.  A small belfry rises above the roof, capped by a pyramidal roof.  The building was built in 1876, originally serving as a church on the ground floor, and a Masonic meeting hall for Yell Lodge #64 on the second. The building was a major community center for Carrollton, which was the first county seat of Carroll County but declined in importance after it was bypassed by the railroads.

In 1962, in a state of decay, the structure was rebuilt by the Arkansas Parks and Publicity Commission. It was listed on the National Register of Historic Places in 1984.

See also
National Register of Historic Places listings in Carroll County, Arkansas

References

Clubhouses on the National Register of Historic Places in Arkansas
Former Masonic buildings in Arkansas
Masonic buildings completed in 1876
National Register of Historic Places in Carroll County, Arkansas
1876 establishments in Arkansas